The Hafez al-Assad Government ruled Syria from 1970 to 1971. The Cabinet of Syria lead by then-Prime Minister Hafez al-Assad. This government was the 55th since Syria gained independence from the Ottoman Empire in 1918 and was the first during presidency of Ahmad al-Khatib.

It was formed 21 November 1970 and was dissolved 3 April 1971.

Ministers 

 Lieutenant-General Hafez al-Assad, Prime Minister and Minister of Defence
 Muhammad Talab Hilal, Deputy Prime Minister and Minister of Agriculture and Agrarian Reform
 Abdel Halim Khaddam, Deputy Prime Minister and Minister of Foreign Affairs
 Mahmoud al-Ayyubi, Deputy Prime Minister and Minister of Education
 Dr. Daoud Al-Radawi, Minister of Health
 Abdul Ghani Qunoot, Minister of Public Works and Water Resources
 Sami Soufan, Minister of State for Planning Affairs
 Dr. Shakir Al Faham, Minister of Higher Education
 Dr. Mustafa Haddad, Minister of Oil, Electricity and Mineral Resources
 Ghaleb Abdoun, Minister of Endowments
 Fayez Ismail, Minister of State
 Suhail Al-Ghazi, Minister of Supply and Internal Trade
 Dr. Naji Al-Darawsheh, Minister of Information
 Dr. Noor Allah Nour Allah, Minister of Finance
 Fawzi Kayali, Minister of Culture, Tourism and National Guidance
 Mahmoud Qanbaz, Minister of Municipal and Rural Affairs
 Youssef Faisal, Minister of State
 Mustafa Hallaj, Minister of Economy and Foreign Trade
 Adeeb Al-Nahwi, Minister of Justice
 Brigadier General Abdul Rahman Khalifawi, Minister of Interior
 Omar El Sebaei, Minister of Transport
 Eng. Abdul Latif Qutait, Minister of Industry
 Engineer Mounir Wannous, Minister of the Euphrates Dam
 Adnan Baghjati, Minister of State for Cabinet Affairs
 Engineer Ahmed Qabalan, Minister of State for Front Village Affairs
 Miteb Shanan, Minister of Social Affairs and Labour

References 
Governments of Syria
Hafez al-Assad
1970 establishments in Syria
1971 disestablishments in Syria
Cabinets established in 1970
Cabinets disestablished in 1971